Yudl Yoffe or Yudl Yofe (1882, Borzna, Chernigov Governorate – 1941 or 1942, Moscow) a was Yiddish writer, translator and sculptor.

Left an orphan early, he was brought up by his sister in Nizhyn, Chernigov Governorate, worked as an apprentice for a tailor, joined the revolutionary movement and, as an agitator, traveled around the Jewish miasteczkoes of Ukraine and Bessarabia, was arrested. Until 1926 — a tailor. He began his literary work in the magazine «Lebn un Wisnschaft» ( — Life and Science) under the pseudonym «Folkskind» ( — Child of the Folk). In 1903 he published an essay in an illegal publishing house in Chisinau. After the 1905 revolution in Russia, he became close to the anarchists. He began his literary career in 1915 with the publication of the story «Dos Eidem» (Son-in-law) in the magazine «Die idische Welt» (The Yiddish World) (1915). At one time he was engaged in sculpture (self-taught), took part in the Kiev exhibition of Jewish artists in 1920. He was one of the founders of the Jewish section of the Moscow Association of Proletarian Writers. In 1921 he moved to Moscow. Collaborated in Jewish newspapers, magazines. The following books were published: «In Kessl grub» (In the Boiler-Pit; 1929), «A dire» (Flat; 1929), «In groissn NEP Hoif» (In the Large NEP Homestead; 1929), «In Kamf» (In the Fight; 1932), «Onwuks» (Tumor; 1932), «Fun trep, zu trep» (From the Steps to the Steps; 1933), dedicated to the civil war in Ukraine, the years of the New Economic Policy, and socialist construction. Yoffe is a realist writer leaning towards portraiture and lyrical sketching. Workers, worker correspondents, student workers, responsible workers, NEPmans — this is the social type of his works. All his works are imbued with the pathos of the struggle for socialist life and culture. He published essays and poems in various Jewish periodicals. He translated the works of Russian classics into Yiddish.

Works
 1915 דאָס איידעם 
 1929 א דירע : דערציילונגען
 2004 א דירע : דערציילונגען
 1929 אין קעסל-גרוב : דערציילונגען 
 1929 אין גרויסן נעפ הויף 
 in 1930, the book «אין גרויסן נעפ הויף» was published in an authorized translation in Russian under the title: «На нэповском подворьи»
 1932 אנוווקס : (ראמאן אין פיר טיילן)
 1932 אין קאמף : דערציילונגען
 1933 פון טרעפ צו טרעפ
 1934 ארטשיק ברוק : דערצײלונג פאר קינדער
 2003 ארטשיק ברוק : דערצײלונג פאר קינדער
 1936 דאָס איידעמל : ראָמאנ
 1936 דערצײלונגענ
 1936 מעלוכע־פארלאג פונ װײסרוסלאנד
 1938 אלע וועלטנ :  דערציילונגענ
 1938 פונ אמאל
 1940 פרישע קויכעס : ראמאנ
 1940 גינגאָלד
 1941 אפנ גלייכנ וועג : דערציילונגענ

References

Yiddish-language writers
1882 births
1941 deaths
Translators to Yiddish
Writers from the Russian Empire
Soviet writers